() in Korean refers to a cute display of affection often expressed through a cute voice, changes to speech, facial expressions, or gestures.  literally means behaving in a flirtatious, coquettish manner and it is commonly expected for both male and female K-pop idols. However, it is not uncommon for everyday people to behave in such a way, and is widely used as an expression of affection towards loved ones, family, and friends.  can also display closeness with others, which can possibly bring people together.

Background
 plays a huge role in South Korean popular culture, especially in idol girl groups. The higher-registered girl voice popular in girl groups in Korea has been dominant since the first successful female k-pop group S.E.S. emerged in 1997. This style has grown in popularity since then. A famous example of that exaggerated cuteness is the Girls' Generation music video for "Gee", which features much use of hands pointing at, touching and framing the face when showing the girls in turn.

Although more common among female idol groups, male groups often perform  as part of their fanservice. The , or youngest member of a group, is often (but not exclusively) the one encouraged to perform . Another member may get a better response from fans, or be better suited due to physical or emotional characteristics. For some performers,  is merely an extension of their own normal behavior, encouraged by the groups' producers. 

They will "put on the character" briefly for fun and to satisfy fan expectation, in the same way they will sing their earliest hits. Some traces of  will continue as persistent traits.

A pro-forma version of  may become tradition for certain circumstances, such as when idols perform the "Gwiyomi" song, with actions made popular by the South Korean rapper Jung Ilhoon of BtoB.

Puzar argues that  in popular culture affects how young South Korean women act, especially in romantic relationships. Using cute hand gestures and expressions in photos, for example, are commonly seen behaviors in many young women in South Korea.

Linguistics 
Aegyo is not limited to simply "acting cute," and includes several changes to speech, such as affrication, stopping, and /j/ insertion. Aegyo is essentially baby talk, with these changes to speech meant to mimic children. For example, replacing yo (Korean: 요) at the end of a phrase with yong (Korean: 용).

See also
 Bishoujo
 Bishounen
 Kawaii
 Moe
 Kkonminam
 Ulzzang

References

South Korean culture
South Korean youth culture
Korean words and phrases
Concepts in aesthetics